Cameron Heights Collegiate Institute is a public secondary school in Kitchener, Ontario, run by the Waterloo Region District School Board. It is part of the International Baccalaureate (IB) program. The school is located at 301 Charles St. E. As of the 2019–2020 school year, the school has 1,775 students. The school is also one of only two secondary schools in Ontario with its own campus radio station.

IB program

The International Baccalaureate's (IB) Diploma Programme is a two-year curriculum, primarily for students aged 16 to 19. Previous to the two years of enrolling into the IB program, students may enroll in taking "Pre-IB" courses.  Higher level (HL) courses offered include Biology, Chemistry, History, Psychology, and English. Standard level (SL) courses offered include Mathematics and Math Studies, a choice between French B or Spanish Ab Initio, and a choice between Business Management, Visual Arts, Music, Physics, or Chemistry. The Extended Essay, Theory of Knowledge (IB Course), and CAS make up the rest of the IB Diploma.

Sports and clubs

The school's teams are known as the Golden Gaels, and Cameron's mascot is Scotty, the Golden Gael. The school also has a radio station known as "88.5 Gael FM", and provides radio shows daily for the school (morning, and lunch time).  The CHCI Debate Team is particularly active, attending Nationals and North Americans four years running. The Multicultural Club also puts on a multi-cultural show every year that draws hundreds of spectators from around the KW area. The school has won 6 straight WCSSAA track and field championships, 5 consecutive CWOSSA appearances for the senior boys curling team, 5 WCSSAA titles in 6 years for the cross country team, as well as OFSAA gold by badminton and tennis athletes.

Architecture
The school was built in 1967.  At the time, it was the largest secondary school built in Ontario in one phase.  At the front entrance to the school is a tall three-arch portico constructed out of stainless steel.  There are two datestones by the entrance, one of which is inscribed "1867" (Canada's year of confederacy).

Transportation

The school is located just over one block east along Charles Street from the Kitchener Market ION light rail station. Local Grand River Transit bus routes that stop nearby are the 2, 3, 6, 7, and 8.

Notable alumni
Lennox Lewis, former undisputed heavyweight boxing champion
Bernie Ruoff, CFL All-Star football player
Ronnie Pfeffer, CFL placekicker, 2x Grey Cup Champion
Liza Fromer, journalist
Scott Stevens, NHL All-Star hockey player
Aaron Wilson, NLL lacrosse player
Robbyn Hermitage, Olympic badminton player
Tyler Varga, NFL running back, Indianapolis Colts

See also 
List of high schools in Ontario
List of Waterloo Region, Ontario schools

References

External links
 
 Cameron Heights Library

Schools in Kitchener, Ontario
High schools in the Regional Municipality of Waterloo
International Baccalaureate schools in Ontario
Waterloo Region District School Board
1969 establishments in Ontario
Educational institutions established in 1969